Degener is a German surname. Notable people with the surname include:

Edward Degener (1809–1890), German-American politician
Gülşen Degener (born 1968), Turkish-born German carom billiards player
Isa Degener (1924–2018), German-American botanist and conservationist
Joachim Degener (1883–1953), German general
Otto Degener (1899–1988), American botanist and conservationist
Richard Degener (1912–1995), American diver
Theresia Degener (born 1961), German jurist and professor of law

See also
Degen (surname)
Degner

German-language surnames
Surnames from given names